Maureen Schwartz (died 29 May 2019) was a Brazilian tennis player

Schwartz, who grew up in Ceará and is of Jewish descent, was a three-time winner of the Brazilian national championships during the 1960s.

At the 1963 Pan American Games in São Paulo, Schwartz and Maria Bueno paired together to claim a doubles silver medal, behind America's Darlene Hard and Carole Caldwell. She made the quarter-finals of the singles draw.

In 1965 she made her only appearance for the Brazil Federation Cup team, in a World Group quarter-final tie against France in Melbourne. She was beaten in her singles match by Janine Lieffrig, then teamed up with Maria Bueno in a live doubles rubber, which they lost in three sets to Lieffrig and Françoise Dürr. This was the first time that Schwartz had ever played on grass.

References

External links
 
 

1940s births
2019 deaths
Brazilian female tennis players
Sportspeople from Ceará
Jewish tennis players
Jewish Brazilian sportspeople
Tennis players at the 1963 Pan American Games
Pan American Games medalists in tennis
Pan American Games silver medalists for Brazil
Medalists at the 1963 Pan American Games